In computer science, a nearly-sorted sequence, also known as roughly-sorted sequence and as -sorted sequence is a sequence which is almost ordered. By almost ordered, it is meant that no element of the sequence is very far away from where it would be if the sequence were perfectly ordered. It is still possible that no element of the sequence is at the place where it should be if the sequence were perfectly ordered.

The nearly-sorted sequences are particularly useful when the exact order of element has little importance. For example Twitter nearly sort the tweets, up to the second, as there is no need for more precision. Actually, given the impossibility to exactly synchronize all computers, an exact sorting of all tweets according to the time at which they are posted is impossible. This idea led to the creation of Snowflake IDs.

-sorting is the operation of reordering the elements of a sequence so that it becomes -sorted. -sorting is generally more efficient than sorting. Similarly, sorting a sequence is easier if it is known that the sequence is -sorted.  So if a program needs only to consider -sorted sequences as input or output, considering -sorted sequences may save time.

The radius of a sequence is a measure of presortedness, that is, its value indicate how much the elements in the list has to be moved to get a totally sorted value. In the above example of tweets which are sorted up to the second, the radius is bounded by the number of tweets in a second.

Definition 

Given a positive number , a sequence  is said to be -sorted if for each  and for each , . That is, the sequence has to be ordered only for pairs of elements whose distance is at least .

The radius is a measure of presortedness.

A sequence is said to be nearly-sorted or roughly-sorted if its radius is small compared to its length.

Equivalent definition 

A sequence  is -sorted if and only if each range of length ,  is -sorted.

Properties 

All sequences of length  are -sorted, that is, . A sequence is -sorted if and only if it is sorted. A -sorted sequence is automatically -sorted but not necessarily -sorted.

Relation with sorted sequences 

Given a sequence a -sorted sequence  and its sorted permutation ,  is at most .

Algorithms

Deciding whether a sequence is -sorted 

Deciding whether a sequence   is -sorted can be done in linear time and constant space by a streaming algorithm.

Computing the radius of a sequence 

Computing the radius of a sequence can be computed in linear time and space.

Halving the radius of a sequence 

Lets call partitioning the action of reordering the sequence  into a partitioned permutation.

The sequence  can be obtained by partitioning the blocks of elements at position , then by partitioning the blocks of elements at position , and then again the elements at position   for each number  such that those sequences are defined.

Using  processors, with no shared read nor write access to memory, the same algorithm can be applied in  time, since each partition of a sequence can occur in parallel.

Merging -sorted sequences 

Merging two -sorted sequences  and  can be done in linear time and constant space.

First, using the preceding algorithm, both sequences should be transformed into -sorted sequences.

If both 's are empty, then it suffices to return . The case where  is empty and not  is similar by symmetry.

Let us consider the case where neither  is empty.
elements of each list. Let us assume that , the other case is similar by symmetry. Remove

Sorting a -sorted sequence 

A -sorted sequence can be sorted by applying the halving algorithm given above  times. This takes  time on a sequential machine, or  time using  processors.

-sorting a sequence 

Since each sequence  is necessarily -sorted, it suffices to apply the halving algorithm -times. Thus, -sorting can be done in -time. This algorithm is Par-optimal, that is, there exists no sequential algorithm with a better worst-case complexity.

References 

Sorting algorithms